St. John Ambulance in Canada, or SJA ( (ASJ), is a confederation of St John Ambulance Provincial and Territorial Councils under mandate by the "St John Councils Regulations 1975" of the Royal Charter, Statutes and Regulations of the Order of St John (1985). Each Council is governed by a Board of Directors under Provincial or Territorial incorporating legislation together with the St John Ambulance Priory in Canada, incorporated under the federal Canada Not For Profit Corporations Act (2012). The Priory provides support services to the Councils and manages the Order of St. John in Canada.  The Councils deliver the mandate of training and community services and are responsible for their own governance, operations and management.

The mission of St. John Ambulance in Canada is to enable Canadians to improve their health, safety, and quality of life through training and community service.  St John Ambulance in Canada has (collectively) close to 25,000 members in communities across Canada - over 3,500 instructors, over 19,000 volunteers and over 7,000 members of the Order of St John.

History

St. John Ambulance was established in Canada in 1883. Under this banner, volunteers from coast-to-coast carry out the humanitarian services of the Most Venerable Order of the Hospital of St. John of Jerusalem.
 1882 First first aid course in Canada is conducted in Quebec City.
 1892 - 1898 Training centres are founded in Nova Scotia, Ontario, Alberta, Saskatchewan and British Columbia.
 1907 - October 12th marks the opening of the first St. John Ambulance training centre for first aid in Vancouver, BC, in conjunction with CPR (Canadian Pacific Rail).
 1909 First Canadian Ambulance division (No. 1 Forest City) is formed in London, ON.
 1911 - June 24th marks the founding of the British Columbia council of St. John Ambulance Canada
 1912 First Canadian Nursing division (No. 1 Central) is formed in Toronto, ON.
 1920s St. John Councils work closely with the Workmen's Compensation Boards throughout Canada to establish safety standards in the workplace
 1933 First two Cadet divisions are formed in Manitoba (52c, Seven Oaks) and Ontario (47c, Timmins).
 1935 First Cadet Nursing division (18c, Vancouver Central) is formed in Vancouver, BC.
 1939-45 St. John Ambulance Nursing units from each Council are deployed in European theatre of war working closely with the Canadian Army in field hospitals and institutional settings.
 1946 Canadian Order elevated to status of Priory becoming Priory of Canada
 1951 Canadian Red Cross (CRC) and St John Ambulance in Canada sign the St. John Ambulance-Canadian Red Cross Joint Operations Agreement in which SJAC recedes from offering blood services and the CRC recedes from offering First Aid training to industry.
 1972 the Northwest Territories became a Territorial Council and runs the Air Ambulance Service in the Mackenzie Delta on behalf of the GNWT.
 1973 St. John Ambulance in Canada modernizes its teaching methodology by instituting the multi-media approach to training and dispensing with the lecture method.  WCBs in Canada continue to partner with St John Ambulance throughout Canada.
 1977 CRC begins offering First Aid training to industry setting aside the 1951 agreement on Joint Operations with St. John Ambulance in Canada
 1996 Yukon becomes a Branch of the British Columbia Council
 1999 SJAC celebrated the 900th anniversary of the Order of St. John, together with the Alliance Orders of St. John, worldwide.
 2006 Prince Edward Island Council merges with Nova Scotia Council to become the NS/PEI Council
 2008 St. John Ambulance Canada celebrates its 125th anniversary, marking the first first aid course given in Canada, in Quebec City in 1883.
 2009 The 125th anniversary of the inaugural St. John Ambulance first aid course conducted in Ontario at the Royal Military College of Canada (RMC) in Kingston, Ontario. According to a plaque laid at RMC, this course, which was conducted for the benefit of gentlemen cadets and staff, initiated a close and continuous association between St. John Ambulance and the Canadian Forces.

Recognition
On 3 January 1982, Canada Post issued 'St. John Ambulance, 1883-1983' designed by Louis Fishauf. The 32¢ stamps are perforated 13.5 and were printed by Ashton-Potter Limited. in 2008 Canada Post issued a similar envelope/stamp in recognition of the 125th Anniversary of SJAC.

Training
Led by a highly skilled network of medical and health care professionals, St. John Ambulance in Canada is a recognized leader in first aid and CPR training and community services, working with other organizations in setting the standards for training in first aid, CPR and other life-saving skills.  St. John Ambulance in Canada also offers many advanced level courses including the Medical First Responder (MFR) and Emergency Medical Responder (EMR) in several provinces.

Medical First Response Services

The Medical First Response Services were formerly known as St. John Ambulance Brigade and are often still referred to as such, both within the organization and by others. Each MFRS unit are a group of trained volunteers that serve within their community in a variety of ways. Services include first aid services at public events, Medical Services support in times of emergency or disaster, and youth programs that encourage community service and personal development.

SJAC provides patient care and first responder services at public events throughout Canada with their Volunteer Community Services, much in the same way as in England.  Members in Canada wear a similar uniform, and are trained to the new Medical First Responder (MFR) program. In Nova Scotia, the volunteers no longer use the term "Brigade" or "Ambulance". They are now referred to as "St John Volunteer Medical Response". This change came about in an attempt to better reflect what the volunteers can offer to their communities.

Saskatchewan, Newfoundland and Labrador, Ontario, and British Columbia are the only provinces that still wear their full uniform. In Ontario, operational (duty) uniform consists of a pair of black cargo pants (or tactical pants), a button up black shirt (with 'Medical First Responder' reflective on the back) or a Polo shirt. All will be marked with "Medical First Response" and "St. John Ambulance Volunteer" crests on both sleeves. Members in training or are working towards their MFR qualification will either wear a white shirt with "St John Ambulance Volunteer" crests on both sleeves, a black polo shirt, or an unmarked white dress shirt for probationary observers. Worth noting is that probationary observers already have a minimum of standard first aid training plus police security clearance. Rankings are clearly marked on epaulettes. For ceremonial, winter or certain indoor functions a black wool sweater and a black tie are also worn. For head dress, a SJA hat/ cap may be worn at outdoor events. A beret/ peak cap is worn for ceremonial or winter functions. Footwear consists of a pair of black boots/ shoes. It is important to note that Officers (with ranks of 1 pips and above) are also entitled to wear their ceremonial (No. 1) uniforms. The uniform consists of an officer's cap, a white shirt with tie, a tunic with metal buttons, pins, rank pips and full medals, a pair of black pants or skirt and black dress shoes.

Air and Ground Ambulance Services are no longer offered by St John Ambulance Councils in Canada. New Brunswick and Northwest Territoires Councils once offered such services.

Therapy Dog
The SJA Therapy Dog Program began in 1992 in Peterborough, Ontario and has expanded across the country. Partnerships have been established in hospitals, palliative care units, day care centres, senior residences, rest homes, special needs schools, psychiatric hospitals where people are often restricted from having pets and the Vancouver International Airport (YVR).  The Therapy Dog program sees a volunteer and their dog make visits to an institution, often on a weekly basis. Before beginning the handler and their dog undergo extensive testing to ensure the animal has the right temperament for the program. There are many benefits to animal-assisted therapy, including decreased blood pressure and heart rate in patients as well as a chance for positive social interaction.

We Can Help
SJAC provides elementary school students in grade 3 with the We Can Help Program, which provides children with an introduction to first aid skills and basic injury prevention messages, is designed for children ages seven through ten.

Youth Programs
Youth in SJAC are a very important part of the organization as well. The proficiency program allows youth members to gain the Grand Prior's award, as well as work toward the Duke of Edinburgh's Award. Proficiencies are awarded for such demonstration of knowledge of subjects, both related and unrelated to the organization. The program is designed to meet the requirements of the Grand Prior's Award, and to give the youth valuable life skills. The Grand Prior's Award is achieved when the adolescent has completed 6 compulsory and 6 elective proficiency courses. In addition to this, youth members are given the opportunity to perform community service at public events, provided that they are supervised by trained adult members.

Disaster planning and aid
In times of emergency, SJAC can be placed on standby, waiting to provide disaster relief and emergency services to the effected area. Exactly what procedures are taken greatly depends on local Disaster Management planners, however the government of Canada has officially recognised the role SJAC fills in the process. Supplies and equipment may vary as well as numbers of personnel immediately available in the area, but SJAC does have a plan already in place, in the form of the National Duty Officer, for the callup of additional personnel and equipment to augment local Units. This program is under review in New Brunswick as such a program is no longer established in most cities in the province.

Positions, ranks and insignia
Some Councils in Canada have demilitarized the "Brigade" (now "Medical First Responder" or "Volunteer First Responder") dispensing with military-style ranks.  However, other Councils in Canada (specifically BC/YK, Sask, Ontario and Quebec) still utilize military rank insignia similar to the current rank insignia of the Canadian Army. Physicians have epaulets with red borders. Registered Nurses wear their rank insignia over a red bar. Licensed Practical Nurses wear their insignia over a green bar while Paramedics wear theirs over a blue bar. Medical First Responders wear epaulets with one or two orange bars (Ontario)(Uniform standards were changed in 2008, but many members still have the older epaulets.)

See also
 St John Ambulance Ranks and Insignia
 Goodwin House - Former National Office Building
 Service Medal of the Order of St John
 Insignia of the Venerable Order of St John

References

External links

 St. John Ambulance Canada

Canada
Charities based in Canada
Organizations based in Ottawa
Ambulance services in Canada